Mozhdeheh (also known as Mozhdeheh Bālā) is a village in Jirdeh Rural District, in the Central District of Shaft County, Gilan Province, Iran. At the 2006 census, its population was 676, in 167 families.

References 

Populated places in Shaft County